Stian Dagfinn Johnsen (born 1 November 1981) is a retired Norwegian football winger and later manager.

He played senior football for Narvik FK and Beisfjord IL before joining Fredrikstad FK's junior team. He made his senior debut in 2001 and played until 2004, experiencing promotion from the 2. divisjon to Eliteserien.

Ahead of the 2005 he went on to Aalesunds FK, in the summer of 2006 to FK Haugesund, and in the summer of 2008 to FK Mjølner.

In 2013 he became player-manager of SK Hardhaus. He went on to coach Harstad IL in 2014, FK Mjølner in 2016, and Staal Jørpeland IL in 2020.

References

1981 births
Living people
Norwegian footballers
People from Narvik
Fredrikstad FK players
Aalesunds FK players
FK Haugesund players
FK Mjølner players
Eliteserien players
Norwegian First Division players
Association football wingers
Norwegian football managers
Sportspeople from Nordland